The 2nd Vietnam Film Festival was held from February 28 to March 15, 1973, in Hanoi, Vietnam, with the slogan "For the Fatherland and Socialism" (Vietnamese: "Vì Tổ quốc và chủ nghĩa xã hội").

Event 
This is the Film Festival to celebrate the 20th Anniversary of the Vietnam Revolutionary Cinema (1953 - 1973). Therefore, the Golden Lotus is awarded under two systems: films produced from 1953 to 1965 and films produced from 1969 to 1973 (before and after the time that was counted for the 1st Vietnam Film Festival in 1970). With 87 films participating in the Film Festival, 36 Golden Lotuses were awarded in the categories: Feature Film (6 films), Documentary Film (27 films), Animated Film (3 films). For the first time, there are awards to individuals such as director, actor/actress, screenplay, etc.

As for the prize, the recipient is given an extra fountain pen.

Awards for the 20th Anniversary of Vietnam Revolutionary Cinema

Feature film

Documentary/Science film

Animated film

Awards for the 2nd Vietnam Film Festival

Feature film

Documentary/Science film

Animated film

References 

Vietnam Film Festival
Vietnam Film Festival
1973 in Vietnam